The Commandant of Midshipmen is the second-in-command at the United States Naval Academy. According to the Naval Academy, the Commandant of Midshipmen is "responsible for the professional development and day-to-day activities of all 4,400 Midshipmen in the Brigade" and equates to a dean of students at a civilian university. The Commandant reports to the Superintendent. The Commandant is assisted by a Deputy Commandant. Modern Commandants typically hold the Navy rank of captain, but since 2002, three of the Commandants have been a United States Marine Corps colonel. The current Commandant is Colonel James “J.P.” McDonough III.

List of Commandants of Midshipmen
 Lieutenant James Harman Ward 1845–1847
 Lieutenant Sydney Smith Lee 1848–1851
 Lieutenant Thomas Tingey Craven 1851–1855
 Lieutenant Joseph Foster Green 1855–1858
 Lieutenant Thomas Tingey Craven 1858–1860
 Lieutenant Christopher Raymond Perry Rodgers 1860–1861
 Lieutenant George Washington Rodgers 1861–1862
 Lieutenant Edward Simpson 1862–1863
 Commander Thomas G. Corbin 1863–1863
 Commander Donald McNeill Fairfax 1863–1865
 Lieutenant Commander Stephen B. Luce 1865–1868
 Captain Napoleon Bonaparte Harrison 1868–1870
 Captain Samuel P. Carter 1870–1873
 Commander Kidder Randolph Breese 1873–1875
 Commander Edward A. Terry 1875–1878
 Commander Frederick Vallette McNair, Sr. 1878–1883
 Commander Norman von Heldreich Farquhar 1883–1886
 Commander Charles Lathrop Huntington 1886–1887
 Commander Purnell Frederick Harrington 1887–1889
 Commander Henry Glass 1889–1891
 Commander Colby Mitchell Chester 1891–1895
 Commander Willard Herbert Brownson 1895–1896
 Commander Edwin White 1896–1898
 Commander Charles Thomas Hutchins 1898–1900
 Commander Charles Ellwood Colahan 1900–1903
 Commander Charles Johnston Badger 1903–1905
 Captain George Partridge Colvocoresses 1905–1907
 Commander William S. Benson 1907–1908
 Commander Charles Augustus Gove 1908–1909
 Commander George Ramsey Clark 1909–1910
 Commander Robert Edward Coontz 1910–1911
 Commander George Wood Logan 1911–1914
 Captain Guy Hamilton Burrage 1914–1915
 Captain Lloyd Horwitz Chandler Summer 1915
 Captain Louis McCoy Nulton 1915–1918
 Captain William H. Standley 1918–1919
 Captain Wat Tyler Cluverius, Jr. 1919–1921
 Captain Thomas Richardson Kurtz 1921–1924
 Captain Harold Earle Cook 1924–1925
 Captain Sinclair Gannon 1925–1928
 Captain Charles Philip Snyder 1928–1931
 Captain Henry David Cooke, Jr. 1931–1932
 Captain Ralston Smith Holmes 1932–1935
 Captain Forde Anderson Todd 1935–1937
 Rear Admiral Milo Frederick Draemel 1937–1940
 Captain Francis Alfred L. Vossler 1940–1941
 Captain Mahlon Tisdale 1941–1942
 Captain Harvey Edward Overesch 1942–1943
 Captain Stuart Shadrick Murray 1943–1945
 Rear Admiral Stuart Howe Ingersoll 1945–1947
 Captain Frank Trenwith Ward 1947–1949
 Captain Carleton R. Adams 1949
 Captain Robert B. Pirie 1949–1952
 Rear Admiral Charles Allen Buchanan–1952–1954
 Captain Robert T.S. Keith 1954–1956
 Captain Allen M. Shinn 1956–1958
 Captain Frederick L. Ashworth 1958
 Captain William F. Bringle 1958–1960
 Captain James H. Mini 1960–1961
 Captain Charles S. Minter, Jr. 1961–1964
 Captain Sheldon H. Kinney 1964–1967
 Captain Lawrence T. Heyworth Jr. 1967–1969
 Captain Robert P. Coogan 1969–1971
 Captain Max K. Morris  1971–1973
 Captain Donald K. Forbes 1973–1976
 Captain James A. Winnefeld 1976–1978
 Captain Jack N. Darby 1978–1979
 Rear Admiral William F. "Scot" McCauley 1979–1981
 Captain Leon A. Edney 1981–1984
 Captain Leslie N. Palmer 1984
 Captain Stephen K. Chadwick 1985–1987
 Captain Howard W. Habermeyer Jr. 1987–1990
 Captain Joseph W. Prueher 1989–1990
 Captain Michael D. Haskins 1990–1992
 Captain John Bramwell Padgett, III 1992–1994
 Captain William T. R. "Randy" Bogle 1994–1997
 Captain Gary Roughead 1997–December 1999
 Captain Samuel J. Locklear 1999–December 2001
 Colonel John R. Allen January 2002–September 2003 (first Marine Corps officer to serve as commandant; selected brigadier general, January 2003)
 Captain Charles J. "Joe" Leidig, Jr. September 2003–June 2005
 Captain Bruce E. Grooms June 2005–December 2006
 Captain Margaret D. Klein December 2006–June 2008 (first woman to serve as commandant)
 Captain Matthew L. Klunder June 2008–April 2010
 Captain Robert E. Clark II April 2010–May 2013
 Captain William D. Byrne Jr. May 2013–June 2015
 Colonel Stephen E. Liszewski June 2015–June 2017
 Captain Robert B. Chadwick June 2017–June 2019
 Captain Thomas R. Buchanan June 2019–2021
 Colonel James “J.P.” McDonough III 2021-Present

References

External links
Commandant of Midshipmen official webpage

 

1845 establishments in the United States